The Gurten is a mountain situated just to the south of Bern, the capital city of Switzerland.

Facilities on the Gurten include a hotel, restaurants, a  viewing tower and a children's playground. Winter sports facilities are available in winter. The Gurtenfestival, a music festival, is held every year in the middle of July.

The Gurten is accessible on foot, or by the Gurten Funicular from Wabern. Wabern can itself be reached from central Bern by tram, train or car. Wabern bei Bern station, on lines S3 and S31 of the Bern S-Bahn, is adjacent to the lower station of the funicular, as is the Gurtenbahn stop on Bern tramway route 9.

The castle site of Aegerten lies a good  to the south-east of the Gurten summit. The remains consists of a roundish castle hill, which formerly carried a rectangular donjon, surrounded on three sides by a wall and rench.

See also
List of mountains of Switzerland accessible by public transport

References

External links

 Official website of The Gurten 
 Photo of The Gurten on Panoramio 

Mountains of Switzerland
Mountains of the canton of Bern
Mountains of Switzerland under 1000 metres